Planegg is a municipality  in the district of Munich, in Bavaria, Germany. It is located on the river Würm, 13 km west of Munich (centre).

Economy 
Koch Media has its head office in Planegg. It also hosts many biotech-companies, like ADVA Optical Networking, GPC Biotech, MediGene and MorphoSys. In addition, the Max Planck Institute of Neurobiology and the Max Planck Institute of Biochemistry are located in the section of Martinsried. Furthermore, Astelco optical systems, a manufacturer of space systems is located in Planegg.

Education 
There are two primary schools, the Grundschule Planegg and the Grundschule Martinsried, as well as the senior high school Feodor-Lynen-Gymnasium Planegg.

The faculty of biology at the Ludwig Maximilian University of Munich is situated in Planegg.

Transport
The municipality has a railway station, served by the Munich S-Bahn.

Twin towns 
  Meylan, Auvergne-Rhône-Alpes, France (since 1987).
  Bärenstein, Saxony, Germany (since 1992).
  Klausen, South Tyrol, Italy (since 2006).
  Didcot, England, United Kingdom (since 2012).

References

External links 

  

Munich (district)

Planegg